

{{DISPLAYTITLE:Psi4 Aurigae}}

Psi4 Aurigae, Latinized from ψ4 Aurigae, is a single, orange-hued star in the northern constellation of Auriga. It is visible to the naked eye with an apparent visual magnitude of +5.02.

This is a K-type giant star with a stellar classification of K5 III. It has expanded to 33 times the Sun's radius and is radiating 245 times the Sun's luminosity from its photosphere at an effective temperature of about 3,970 K. The atmosphere displays a significant enhancement of silicon.

See also
 Psi Aurigae

References

External links
 HR 2459
 Image Psi4 Aurigae

K-type giants
Auriga (constellation)
Aurigae, Psi04
Durchmusterung objects
Aurigae, 55
047914
032173
2459